Elsbeth Schragmüller (7 August 1887, Schlüsselburg near Petershagen, Kingdom of Prussia, German Empire — 24 February 1940, Munich, Nazi Germany), also known as Fräulein Doktor and Mademoiselle Docteur, as well as Fair Lady, La Baronne and Mlle. Schwartz, was a German university professor-turned-spymaster for Abteilung III b in German-occupied Belgium during World War I.

Early life
Schragmüller was the eldest of four children born to Prussian Army officer and bailiff Carl Anton Schragmüller and his wife Valesca Cramer von Clausbruch. Her younger brother was the future Sturmabteilung (SA) police chief of Magdeburg, Konrad Schragmüller. 

Schragmüller spent her childhood first in Schlüsselburg and then in Münster with her grandmother, who educated her. From 1909 to 1914, she studied political science at Albert-Ludwigs-Universität in Freiburg. She finished her studies in 1913 and was one of the first women in Germany to acquire a university degree. After her studies, she worked for the Berlin Lette-Verein as a lecturer in civic education.

First World War
After the outbreak of the First World War, Schragmüller moved to occupied Belgium, where the German governor general, Field Marshal Colmar von der Goltz, assigned her to Section VII, wherein she opened and assessed private letters in search of coded messages to the Allies.

She later switched to intelligence collection and worked, after a short training period, in Lille for the General Staff's counterintelligence wing, Abteilung IIIb. In 1915, Colonel Walter Nicolai, the head of Abteilung IIIb, promoted her to spymaster of the Kriegsnachrichtenstelle Antwerpen. When the war ended, Schragmüller held the rank of Oberleutnant in the Imperial German Army and had been awarded the Iron Cross First Class.

Later life
After the armistice in 1918, Schragmüller resumed her academic career and became the first female assistant chair at Freiburg University. A few years later, she moved with her family to Munich. Soon afterward, her father and her brother Konrad, a senior SA officer, were shot during the Night of the Long Knives. Soon, she ended her career abruptly for unknown reasons.

Death
Schragmüller died in 1940 at the age of 52 of bone tuberculosis in her Munich apartment.

Legacy
Her activities were the subject of various urban legends during the First World War, but since she was neither captured nor unmasked during her lifetime, much of her life story remains obscure and speculative, and it is unclear to what extent the various fictional treatments of her life story are accurate.

For many years, she was invariably known as Mademoiselle Docteur or Fräulein Doktor, her actual name being revealed only in 1945 from German intelligence documents captured by the Allies after World War II, when she had already died of miliary tuberculosis in 1940. 

Her nickname acknowledges the fact that she had a doctoral degree in political science, not psychology as some fictional portrayals have claimed, from the University of Freiburg.

Her death early in the Second World War makes it unlikely that she contributed materially to the war effort even if some have claimed that she again engaged in espionage activities.

See also
 Stamboul Quest – 1934 American film starring Myrna Loy
 Mademoiselle Docteur (also known as Salonique nid d’espions and Street of Shadows) – 1937 French film directed by G.W. Pabst
 Mademoiselle Doctor (also known as Under Secret Orders) – 1937 English film directed by Edmond T. Gréville, an English version of the above, shot at the same time, but with some cast changes.
 Fräulein Doktor – 1969 film, an Italian/Yugoslavian co-production
Mata Hari – 1985 film; Elsbeth Schragmüller is shown as the master spy.

References
Notes

External links 
 The Films of 'Fraulein Doctor'

German women in World War I
World War I spies for Germany
Female wartime spies
1887 births
1940 deaths
Tuberculosis deaths in Germany
People from Petershagen
University of Freiburg alumni
German Army personnel of World War I
Recipients of the Iron Cross (1914), 1st class
Academic staff of the University of Freiburg
20th-century deaths from tuberculosis
Spymasters
German women academics